Riddagshausen Abbey was a Cistercian monastery just outside the city of Brunswick in Germany.

History
It was founded as Marienzelle by Ludolf the Wend,  a ministerialis of Henry the Lion and steward of Brunswick, and settled in 1145 by monks from Amelungsborn Abbey. Henry endowed the new foundation in 1146 with the neighbouring village of Riddagshausen, from which it took its name.

The abbey early acquired reichsunmittelbar status as an Imperial abbey.

It was mediatised in 1569 by Brunswick-Wolfenbüttel, when it became a Protestant establishment. From 1690 it was also the home of a prestigious Lutheran seminary for training of preachers, the first in Germany. The religious community and the seminary were dissolved in 1809.

Description
The site, now included within the city of Brunswick, in the district of Wabe-Schunter-Beberbach, is now mostly a nature reserve and arboretum. The nature reserve Riddagshäuser Teiche is designated as Important Bird Area and Special Protection Area.

The surviving buildings include the abbey church and the gatehouse, now home of the Cistercian Museum.

Notes and references

External links
  Riddagshausen: local history and photo gallery
  Riddagshausen Abbey photo gallery
  Riddagshausen Abbey photos

Cistercian monasteries in Germany
Imperial abbeys
Monasteries in Lower Saxony
1140s establishments in the Holy Roman Empire
1145 establishments in Europe
Religious organizations established in the 1140s
Lutheran seminaries
Christian monasteries established in the 12th century
Churches in Braunschweig
History of Brunswick
Museums in Lower Saxony
Important Bird Areas of Germany
Special Protection Areas
Brunswick Ridddagshausen
Duchy of Brunswick
Lutheran universities and colleges in Europe